Ömer Bayram (born 27 July 1991) is a Turkish professional footballer who plays as a left back for Eyüpspor.

Club career
Bayram played youth football for PCP and Baronie before moving to the youth academy of NAC Breda. He made his debut in the Eredivisie in the 2009–10 season playing for NAC in a home match against VVV-Venlo.

Kayserispor
In June 2012, Bayram left NAC Breda and signed with Kayserispor on a free transfer. He chose shirt number 38, as this is the postal code of the province of Kayseri, where his parents originally came from. Bayram suffered relegation with the club to the TFF First League in the 2013–14 season, only to promote back to the highest level after winning the second-tier title in 2014–15. He finished his fourth and final season with Kayserispor in 15th place in the Süper Lig, one spot above the relegation zone.

Akhisar Belediyespor
In June 2016, Bayram signed a three-year contract with Akhisar Belediyespor. On 10 May 2018, Bayram helped the club win its first professional trophy, the 2017–18 Turkish Cup.

Galatasaray
On 31 August 2018, Bayram signed with Turkish giants Galatasaray on a three-year contract, with the club paying a reported €400,000 for the left back. On 16 June 2021, Galatasaray announced that Bayram's contract was extended for 3 years.

On 8 September 2022, the contract between Bayram and Galatasaray was mutually terminated.

Eyüpspor
On 8 September 2022, he signed a 2-year contract with Eyüpspor.

International career
Born in the Netherlands, Bayram is a youth international for Turkey. He made his debut for the senior Turkey national football team in a friendly 2–2 tie with Montenegro on 27 March 2018.

Honours
Kayserispor
TFF First League: 2014–15

Akhisarspor
Turkish Cup: 2017–18
Turkish Super Cup: 2018

Galatasaray
Süper Lig: 2018–19
Turkish Cup: 2018–19
Turkish Super Cup: 2019

Career statistics

Club

International

References

External links
 

 Voetbal International

1991 births
Living people
Footballers from Breda
Turkish footballers
Turkey international footballers
Turkey B international footballers
Turkey under-21 international footballers
Dutch footballers
Dutch people of Turkish descent
NAC Breda players
Kayserispor footballers
Akhisarspor footballers
Eredivisie players
Süper Lig players
Association football defenders
Galatasaray S.K. footballers
TFF First League players
Turkey youth international footballers
Eyüpspor footballers